Georgia has participated in the Eurovision Song Contest 14 times since making its debut in . Georgia has reached the final on seven occasions, achieving two top ten placements, with Sofia Nizharadze and Eldrine both finishing ninth.

History
On 27 October 2006, Georgia confirmed that they wished to debut at the Eurovision Song Contest 2007. At that time, the European Broadcasting Union (EBU) still limited the contest to a maximum of 40 countries, however, in March 2007, it was announced that all 42 applicants would participate in the 2007 contest in Helsinki. At the contest, Georgia managed to progress from the semi-final (where it scored 123 points, finishing 8th), but only came 12th (out of 24) in the final. Georgia appeared for its second time in the contest for 2008, represented by Diana Gurtskaya with the song "Peace Will Come". It had slightly better luck than in 2007, progressing from the semi-final (where it scored 107 points, finishing 5th) and coming in 11th (out of 25) in the final.

Due to the 2008 South Ossetia war, it had been debated by Georgian Public Broadcaster (GPB) whether Georgia would be present at the Eurovision Song Contest 2009 in Moscow. GPB chairman stated that it would not be unreasonable to withdraw, but that they were under a time restraint since a national selection event would have to be organised if they chose to participate. On 28 August 2008, GBP announced their intention to withdraw from the 2009 contest, citing that they refuse to compete in a "country that violates human rights and international laws", as well as doubts being cast on the safety of their participants. 
After winning the Junior Eurovision Song Contest 2008 and getting the maximum 12 points from Russia at the event, they were encouraged to participate again in 2009.

After a national final was held on 18 February 2009 the selected entry for Georgia was decided to be Stephane and 3G with their 70s-inspired song "We Don't Wanna Put In". However the song gained controversy due to the lyrics of the song, which included perceived political references to Russian Prime Minister Vladimir Putin, which GPB denied. Nevertheless, the EBU banned the song from competing due to its lyrics, and asked GPB to either change the lyrics of the song or select another song to compete. GPB claimed that the EBU's rejection of the song was due to political pressure exerted by Russia, and later withdrew from the contest entirely on 11 March.

Georgia returned to the contest in 2010, and was represented by 23-year-old singer Sofia Nizharadze. Sopho sang the song "Shine" at the contest, written by Hanne Sørvaag, Harry Sommerdahl and Christian Leuzzi. Georgia competed in the second semi-final of the contest on 27 May, performing in the 16th slot, and qualified for the final. Georgia came 9th in the final, with 136 points, achieving their best place so far.

In 2011, Georgia sent the rock band Eldrine to the contest in Düsseldorf, Germany. They managed to equal Sopho Nizharadze's 9th place of the year before. In 2012, Georgia sent Anri Jokhadze to the contest in Baku, Azerbaijan with the song "I'm a Joker", Anri was the first male entrant ever to represent Georgia at Eurovision. On 24 May 2012, he became the first Georgian representative to fail to reach the Eurovision Song Contest final. In 2013, Georgia selected its entry internally. Nodi Tatishvili and Sophie Gelovani was the first duo to represent Georgia in Eurovision. The song was produced by 2012's winning composer Thomas G:son. In the second semi-final Georgia qualified in 10th, and in the final Georgia came in 15th place with 50 points. In 2014, Georgia selected jazz fusion band the Shin alongside vocalist Mariko Ebralidze to the contest in Copenhagen, Denmark. Their song, "Three Minutes to Earth", was panned by critics and placed last in the second semi-final. This is the worst Georgian result to date. In 2015, Georgia held a national final for the first time since 2012. Nina Sublatti and her song "Warrior" were chosen to represent Georgia in the contest. It qualified from the first semi-final. Nina Sublatti eventually reached an 11th place in the grand final. On December 15, 2015, Georgia internally selected Nika Kocharov and Young Georgian Lolitaz to represent Georgia in the 2016 contest. They finished 9th in semi-final and 20th in the grand final. In 2017, GPB went back to an national final, with Tamara Gachechiladze and her song "Keep the Faith" winning the selection. She performed second at the first semi-final, but failed to qualify for the final, finishing 11th with 99 points in the first semi-final.

In 2018, Georgia internally selected Iriao (billed as Ethno-Jazz Group Iriao for the contest) to represent them in Lisbon, Portugal with the song "For You". In spite of its English name, it was their first entry performed entirely in the Georgian language. The song resulted in another non-qualification, with Georgia finishing last in their semi-final once again. For 2019, their act for Tel Aviv was selected through Georgia's Star, the Georgian version of the Pop Idol franchise. The selected artist was Oto Nemsadze with the song "Keep On Going", their second entry that is completely in Georgian, which later failed to reach the final, placing 14th in the first semi-final with 62 points.

Georgia's Star was used once again for 2020, with the chosen artist being Tornike Kipiani with the song "Take Me As I Am". However, the 2020 contest was later cancelled due to the COVID-19 pandemic, and Kipiani was later retained as the Georgian representative for 2021, this time with the song "You". The song failed to qualify for the final, with Georgia finishing 16th in their semi-final. Another internal selection was carried out for 2022, with the band Circus Mircus and their song "Lock Me In" being chosen to represent Georgia; they too failed to qualify for the final, finishing 18th (last) in their semi-final.

Participation overview

Awards

Marcel Bezençon Awards

Barbara Dex Award

Related involvement

Heads of delegation

Commentators and spokespersons

Other shows

Photogallery

See also
Georgia in the Junior Eurovision Song Contest
Georgia in the Türkvizyon Song Contest

Notes and references

Notes

References

External links
 Points to and from Georgia eurovisioncovers.co.uk

Countries in the Eurovision Song Contest